B. Puttaswamayya (kannada:ಬಿ. ಪುಟ್ಟಸ್ವಾಮಯ್ಯ) (24 May 1897 – 25 January 1984) was an Indian novelist, playwright and journalist who wrote in the Kannada language. He was awarded the prestigious Sahitya Academy Award in 1964 for his novel Kranthi Kalyana, and the Sangeet Natak Akademi Fellowship in 1978 for his plays by the Government of India.

Writings

Historical fiction
Kranthi Kalyana ( 6 vol) - Udayaravi, Rajyapala, kalyaneshwara, nagabandha, mugiyada kanasu, Kalyana kranti - based on life of Sri basavanna
Mrunalini (Translation of Bengali Novel by Bankim Chandra Chatterjee)
Thejaswini (Translation of Bengali Novel by Bankim Chandra Chatterjee's Rajasimha)
Prabhudeva 
Roopalekha - Imaginary story at the backdrop Vijayanagar empire - Devaraya II - 1442-1446 time frame
Itihasada Putagalinda - Historical Short stories
Dwa Suparna - 7th century story happening during the Gangaa Period 
Priyadarshi Raja - Emperor Ashoka story
Chalukya Tailapa - Tailapa founder of Kalyana Chalukya

Social fiction
Ardhangi (translation of Manilal Banerjee's Bengali novel Swayamsiddha - filmed as Mallammana Pavaada) 
Hoovu Kaavu
Sudhamayi
Abhisaarike (sequel for Sudhamayi)
Ratnahaara
Natya Mohini

Play and literary criticism
Samagra Natakagalu
Mooru Natakagalu
Kurukshetra
Chirakumara Sabha
Dashavatara
Taraka Vadhe
Dravaswamini

Religion
Shivamahinma Sutra Soundrya Lahari
Sri Durgasaptashati
Sri Lalita Sahasara Sangatya
Sampurna Ramayana

References

External links 
 

1897 births
1984 deaths
Indian male novelists
Recipients of the Sahitya Akademi Award in Kannada
20th-century Indian dramatists and playwrights
20th-century Indian novelists
Indian male dramatists and playwrights
20th-century Indian male writers
Recipients of the Sangeet Natak Akademi Fellowship